T. dentatus may refer to:
 Tarsius dentatus, the Dian's tarsier or Diana tarsier, a nocturnal primate species endemic to central Sulawesi, Indonesia
 Tridentarius dentatus, the toothed conch, a sea snail species found in the Red Sea and the Indian Ocean

See also 
 Dentatus (disambiguation)